Aeon or æon means age, or alternatively forever or for eternity. It may also refer to:

Literacy
 Aeon (magazine), an online magazine of philosophy and culture, launched in 2012
 Aeon (language school), an English language school in Japan
 Aeon Publications, an imprint of MU Press

Music
 Aeon, a classical record label now part of Outhere
 Aeon (band), a Swedish death metal band
 Aeons (duo), an Irish music duo
 Aeon (album), an album by Zyklon

Songs 
 "Aeon" (song), a song by Antony and the Johnsons
 "Aeon", a song by Crystal Lake on their album Helix
 "Aeon", a song by Killing Joke on their album Democracy
 "Aeon", a song by Lacuna Coil on their album Comalies
 "Aeon", a song by Neurosis on their album Through Silver in Blood
 "Aeons", a song by Karnivool on their album Asymmetry

Gaming
 Aeons (Final Fantasy), a number of creatures in the Final Fantasy series
 Aeon, a legendary necklace in Titan Quest
 Trinity (role-playing game), formerly known as Æon
 Aeon, a playable character from the video game series Castlevania
Aeons, ancient evil beings in the video game Fable

Vehicles and transportation
 Aeon Motor, a Taiwanese manufacturer of ATVs, scooters and mini-bikes
 Relativity Space Aeon series of rocket engines
 SS Aeon (1905), an Australian steamship constructed in England in 1905 and wrecked Kiritimati 1908

Retailers
 AEON (company), a holding company of Æon Group and Aeon supermarkets of Japan
 Æon Group, a Japanese retailer chain
 ÆON Bukit Tinggi Shopping Centre, a shopping center in Bandar Bukit Tinggi, Klang, Selangor, Malaysia

Religion, philosophy, spirituality
 Aeon (Gnosticism), an emanation of God in Gnosticism
 Aeon (Thelema), large-scale historical units in the doctrine of Thelema

Other
 Gigaannum (Ga), 109 years

See also 

 
 Aion (disambiguation)
 Aon (disambiguation)
 Eon (disambiguation)
 Kalpa (aeon)